Mivtach Shamir Holdings is an investment company based in Israel. Led by Israeli investor Meir Shamir, Mivtach Shamir invests in three sectors: technology and communications, industrial investments and real estate.  Shares of Mivtach Shamir are traded on the Tel Aviv Stock Exchange (TASE) as MISH.

History 
Mivtach Shamir Holdings was founded in 1958 as Attas Industries Halva, Tahini, and Sweets, a privately held food production manufacturing company. Attas listed on the Tel Aviv Stock Exchange in 1983.  Meir Shamir acquired a controlling share in the company in 1992. In the same year, Shamir restructured the company and started working in insurance and pension fund management. The name was changed from Attas Industries to Mivtach Shamir Holdings.

In 1999 Mivtach acquired 10% of Zen Media, an Internet company. In 2001 -  55,1% of Mivtach Shamir Finance was sold to the Migdal Group for  68 million NIS. 

In January 2008, Mivtacch Shamir and Apax Partners announced the acquisition of a controlling share of Tnuva Group.  On March 30, 2015 Mivtach announced the sale of Tnuva Food Industries Ltd. to Chinese company - Bright Food, the deal was reported to have been worth NIS 1.1 billion for Mivtach Shamir.

Investments 
Mivtach Shamir Holdings has a 44.69% stake in Elbit Vision Systems Ltd. and a 5.5% stake in Gilat Satellite Ltd. Other direct holdings and investments in real estate include 26.16% of Maniff Financial Services, a 42.34% investment in Hot Hasharon Towers and 34.64% of the shares in Digel Investments and Holdings Ltd. Industrial sector holdings include a 20% stake in Tnuva Group and 42% of Norphat as well as a 16,57% stake in Solber Industries.

Corporate social responsibility 

Mivtach Shamir is a contributor to the Association for the Wellbeing of Israel’s Soldiers (AWIS) Adoption project which funds recreational activities for several Israel Defense Force (IDF) battalions.  The company donated an ambulance to the ZAKA emergency response teams working in Petah Tikva.

References 

Financial services companies established in 1958
Investment companies of Israel
1958 establishments in Israel
Companies listed on the Tel Aviv Stock Exchange